The Chattanoogan and its website Chattanoogan.com is an online media outlet that concentrates on news from Chattanooga, Tennessee. It is published by John Wilson, previously a staff writer for the Chattanooga Free Press. The website was launched on September 1, 1999, and calls itself "one of the first full-service web-only daily newspapers in the country".

References

External links
 

Internet properties established in 1999
Mass media in Chattanooga, Tennessee
Publications established in 1999
1999 establishments in Tennessee